The open water swimming at the 2019 Southeast Asian Games in the Philippines was held at the Hanjin Boat Terminal in Cubi, Subic on 10 December 2019. It was the first time such event was held in the SEA Games. Only one event was contested: the men's 10 km. It was one of four aquatic sports contested at the SEA Games, along with diving, swimming, and water polo.

Medal summary

Medal table

Medalists

Results
The race was held on 10 December 2019.

Source: 2019 SEA Games

References

External links
 

Men's 10 km open water
Southeast Asian games 2019
2019 Southeast Asian Games events